Donald Provost Dillaway (March 17, 1903 – November 18, 1982) was an American stage and film actor.

Early years
Dillaway's mother, billed as Nettie Gordon, sang in vaudeville. Because she and his father insisted on a professional career for him, he studied law in Buffalo. He disliked that profession so much, however, that he moved to New York. Eventually his parents accepted his preference for entertaining and encouraged him in that career.

Career
Dillaway had numerous appearances on Broadway. His Broadway debut came in The Backslapper (1925).

In 1927, Dillaway was one of seven actors who were found guilty in New York City of participating in the production of an obscene play, The Virgin Man. They received suspended sentences, and three producers of the play were fined $250 each and sentenced to 10 days in the workhouse.

In 1928, Dillaway acted with the Lakewood Players. He also acted with Otis Skinner in Papa Juan for two seasons.

Dillaway's film debut came in Meet the Widow (1930). He had supporting roles in several films of the 1930s, including Pack Up Your Troubles in 1932, the second feature film from Laurel and Hardy. His roles became gradually smaller in the 1940s and 1950s, usually uncredited bit parts.

His numerous TV appearances include Maverick, Bonanza, Perry Mason, The Munsters, Run for Your Life, and The Big Valley. His final role before retiring in 1967 was in The Wild Wild West.

After he left acting, Dillaway worked as head of RKO's New Talent Department, and he was an agent for actors. Later he had his own real estate agency.

Death
He died in Westlake Village, California at age 79. He was buried in Pierce Brothers Valley Oaks Memorial Park,  Westlake Village, California.

Filmography

The Interview (1929) as The Cub Reporter (film debut) 
Cimarron (1931) as Adult Cim (uncredited) 
Young as You Feel (1931) as Billy Morehouse
Platinum Blonde (1931) as Michael Schuyler
Men in Her Life (1931) as Dick Webster
 The Night Mayor (1932)
Pack Up Your Troubles (1932) as Eddie Smith
The Animal Kingdom (1932) as Joe Fiske 
Cross-Examination (1932) as David Wells 
Attorney for the Defense (1932) as Paul Wallace
The Important Witness (1933) as Steve Connors 
The Little Giant (1933) as Gordon Cass 
 Marriage on Approval (1933) as Larry Bennett
 The Circus Clown (1934) as Jack
Cipher Bureau (1938) as Paul Waring 
Horror Island (1941) as Sailor (uncredited) 
The Postman Didn't Ring (1942) as Reporter (uncredited) 
The Magnificent Ambersons (1942) as Wilbur Minafer (uncredited)
Over My Dead Body (1942) as Reporter 
Gangway for Tomorrow (1943) as Frank Danielson 
Gunmen of Abilene (1950) as Bill Harper 
Plymouth Adventure (1952) - Stephen Hopkins
The Caine Mutiny (1954) as George (uncredited) 
Tarantula (1955) as Jim Bagny (uncredited) 
Sunrise at Campobello (1960) as Sloan (uncredited) 
The Absent Minded Professor (1961) as Defense Department Secretary (uncredited) 
Back Street (1961) as Cleve (final film, uncredited)

References

External links

1903 births
1982 deaths
American male film actors
Burials at Valhalla Memorial Park Cemetery
20th-century American male actors
Burials at Valley Oaks Memorial Park
Male actors from New York City